Beach volleyball competitions at the 2019 Pan American Games in Lima, Peru were held between July 24 and 30 at the Estadio de Volley de Playa a temporary venue in the San Miguel cluster.

Two medal events are scheduled to be contested. The events are: a men's and women's tournament. A total of 64 athletes (32 per gender and 16 teams per event) are scheduled to compete.

Medal table

Medalists

Participating nations
A total of 19 countries qualified athletes. The number of athletes a nation entered is in parentheses beside the name of the country.

Qualification

A total of 64 Beach volleyball athletes will qualify to compete. Each nation may enter a maximum of 4 athletes (one team per gender of two athletes). As host nation, Peru automatically qualified a full team of four athletes (one team per gender). All other quotas were awarded through the NORCECA (North America, Central America and Caribbean) and CSV (South America) rankings. The top 10 teams from NORCECA qualified along with the top five teams from CSV.

See also
Beach volleyball at the 2020 Summer Olympics

References

External links
Results book

 
Events at the 2019 Pan American Games
Pan American Games
2019